City Clinical Hospital No. 1 is a hospital in 
Zayeltsovsky District of Novosibirsk, Russia. It was founded in 1930. Many hospital buildings are built in the constructivist style.

History
In 1930, treatment building No 3 was built.

In the early 1930s, British writer Robert Byron appreciated the hospital buildings.

In 1967, the main medical building was constructed.

In the 1990s, an operating and resuscitation medical building was built.

Famous medics
V. M. Mysh, A. L. Myasnikov, N. I. Gorizontov, A. V. Triumfov, N. A. Bogolepov, G. D. Zalessky, A. A. Kolen, D. T. Kuimov and others.

References

Bibliography

External links
Памятники истории, архитектуры и монументального искусства Новосибирской области.

Hospitals in Novosibirsk
Hospitals established in 1930
Zayeltsovsky City District, Novosibirsk
Constructivist architecture